Vadaseri North is a village in the Orathanadu taluk of Thanjavur district, Tamil Nadu, India.

Geography 
Vadaseri North is located 17 kilometres from Orattanadu, 42 kilometres east of Thanjavur, and 342 kilometres from the State capital, Chennai.

Demographics 

As per the 2001 census, Vadaseri North had a total population of 4496 with 2222 males and 2274 females. The sex ratio was 1023. The literacy rate was 70.95.

References 
 

 

Villages in Thanjavur district